Marle may refer to:

 Marle (Chrono Trigger), a character from the 1995 video game Chrono Trigger
 Marle, Aisne, a commune in France
 Marle, a hamlet in the Dutch municipality of Olst-Wijhe
 Marle, a hamlet in the Dutch municipality of Hellendoorn

See also 
 Marl (disambiguation)